A squint is the action of tightening of the muscles around the eye. 

Squint may also refer to:

 Squint, a term for strabismus (crossed eyes)
 Squint (album), a 1993 album by Steve Taylor
 Squint (antenna), an angle of transmission offset 
 Squint (opening) (hagioscope), an opening through the wall of a church in an oblique direction
 Squint Entertainment, a record label
 Squint Lake, a lake in Burnaby, British Columbia, Canada
 Squint Phares (1915–1974), American basketball player 
 Squint Hunter, coach for the Saint Louis Billikens men's basketball team, 1926–1927